John C. Rice (April 7, 1857, Sullivan County, New York – June 5, 1915, Philadelphia, Pennsylvania) was an American born Broadway stage actor and vaudevillian who is credited with performing the first onscreen kiss with May Irwin in 1896 for the Thomas Edison film company film The Kiss. The film was a 47-second recreation of a scene from the Broadway play The Widow Jones starring Irwin and Rice.

Rice's Broadway credits included Vivian's Papas (1903), Are You a Mason? (1901), Courted Into Court (1897), and The Widow Jones (1895).

Rice also performed in vaudeville, including teaming with Sally Cohen to present the sketch "Our Honeymoon" at Keith's Theater in Boston in 1898. In 1907, they performed the skit "A Bachelor's Wife" at Chase's in Washington, D. C.

References

External links

 Victorian era portrait of young John C. Rice (North American Theatre Online, alexanderstreet)

1857 births
1915 deaths
American male stage actors
American male film actors
20th-century American male actors
Broadway theatre people
Vaudeville performers